Montara State Beach is a beach located in the coastal region of the U.S. state of California, eight miles north of Half Moon Bay on State Route 1. It is operated by the California State Department of Parks and Recreation under the San Mateo Coast Sector Office. It is one of the cleanest beaches in the state and is known for surfing and fishing.

Montara State Marine Reserve & Pillar Point State Marine Conservation Area extends offshore from Montara State Beach.

Facilities and regulations

There are two beach access points. Dogs are allowed on-leash (6 ft. maximum). Fireworks and fires are not permitted.

There are bike, hiking, and horseback trails. The Devil's Slide is at the north end of the beach and the trail starts from a beach parking lot. A lighthouse operated as a hostel is part of the state park.

The 690-acre McNee Ranch, on Montara Mountain, encompasses coastal mountain habitat and has sweeping views of the coast. The ranch's two-mile Pedro Mountain Trail connects to trails leading to Montara Beach and Gray Whale Cove.

History
The first European land exploration of Alta California, the Spanish Portolà expedition, camped in this area on October 30, 1769, possibly at Martini Creek, which reaches the sea at Montara beach (Bolton says San Vicente Creek, farther south). Franciscan missionary Juan Crespi noted in his diary, "We stopped not far from the shore at the foot of some hills which prevent us from passing along the beach. They form a valley sheltered from the north, from which flows an arroyo with plenty of good water...on account of the large number of mussels which they found on this beach, very good and large, the men called it Punta de las Almejas."

See also
McNee Ranch State Park
List of beaches in California
List of California state parks

References

External links

Official webpage
Coastal Images

California State Beaches
Parks in San Mateo County, California
San Francisco Bay Area beaches
Beaches of San Mateo County, California
Beaches of Northern California